Cheqa or Choqa or Chaqa may refer to:
 Chaqa, Isfahan
 Choqa, Kermanshah
 Cheqa, Markazi
 Chogha (disambiguation)

See also
Chaqa and Cheqa and Choqa are common elements in Iranian place names; see: